Chaudhry Salik Hussain is a Pakistani politician who has been a member of the National Assembly of Pakistan since October 2018.

Political career
He was elected to the National Assembly of Pakistan as a candidate of the Pakistan Muslim League (Q) (PML-Q) from Constituency NA-65 (Chakwal-II) in by-elections held on 14 October 2018.

On 22 April 2022, he was appointed Federal Minister without a portfolio in the federal cabinet of Shehbaz Sharif. On 12 May, he was given the portfolio as the Federal Minister of the Board of Investment and was made responsible for Chinese and other foreign direct investments and special measures.

References 

Living people
Pakistani MNAs 2018–2023
Punjabi people
Chaudhry family
Children of prime ministers of Pakistan
1979 births